Let's Make a Dream (French: Faisons un rêve) is a 1916 comedy play by the French writer Sacha Guitry. It premiered at the Théâtre des Bouffes-Parisiens in Paris on 3 October 1916, and has been revived numerous times.

Adaptations
In 1930 it was turned into the British film Sleeping Partners directed by Seymour Hicks. A French adaptation Let's Make a Dream followed in 1936, directed by  Guitry himself.

References

Bibliography
 Goble, Alan. The Complete Index to Literary Sources in Film. Walter de Gruyter, 1999.

1916 plays
Plays by Sacha Guitry
Plays set in France
French plays adapted into films
Comedy plays